The 1956 Detroit Titans football team represented the University of Detroit in the Missouri Valley Conference (MVC) during the 1956 NCAA University Division football season. In their third season under head coach Wally Fromhart, the Titans compiled a 2–8 record (0–4 against conference opponents), finished last in the MVC, and were outscored by opponents by a combined total of 194 to 99.

The team's statistical leaders included Lou Faoro with 356 passing yards, Billy Russell with 183 rushing yards, Albert Korpak with 268 receiving yards, and Bill Dando with 24 points scored.

In addition to head coach Wally Fromhart, the coaching staff included Kenneth Stilley (line coach), Robert Dove (end coach), John Ray (freshman coach), and Dr. Raymond D. Forsyth (trainer). Robert Chendes and James Lynch were the team co-captains.

Schedule

See also
 1956 in Michigan

References

External links
 1956 University of Detroit football programs

Detroit
Detroit Titans football seasons
Detroit Titans football
Detroit Titans football